King Jungcheon of Goguryeo (224–270, r. 248–270) was the 12th ruler of Goguryeo, the northernmost of the Three Kingdoms of Korea

Family
Father: King Dongcheon (동천왕, 東川王)
Grandfather: King Sansang (산상왕, 山上王)
Consorts and their respective issue(s):
Queen, of the Yeon clan (왕후 연씨, 王后 椽氏); born in Yeonnabu (연나부, 椽那部).
Unnamed son
Prince Yakro (약로, 藥盧; d. 292)
Prince Dalga, the Lord of An (안국군 달가, 安國君 達賈; d. 292) – had a virtue appearance that made him killed by the jealous King Bongsang.
Prince Ilu (일우, 逸友; d. 286) – killed by King Seocheon.
Prince Sobal (소발, 素勃; d. 286) – killed by King Seocheon.
Unknown princess – married Myeongrim Holdo (명림홀도, 明臨笏覩) from Yeonnabu in 256.
Lady Gwanna (관나부인, 貫那夫人; d. 251); born in Gwannabu (관나부, 貫那部) and was executed – No issue.

Background and rise to the throne
He was the son of King Dongcheon and was made heir to the throne in the 17th year of his father's reign. Upon his father's death in 248, Jungcheon followed him on the throne.

Reign

Deaths within the Royal family 
In the 11th month of that year, Jungcheon's younger brothers Go Ye-mul, Go Sa-gu and others sought to betray him, but were caught and executed. 

He married Lady Yeon, probably from the Yeonna-bu region. In 251, he came across a beautiful woman with nine-feet black hair from Gwanna region. Needless to say, two wives of Jungcheon argued severely at all times, trying to fend off each other out of king’s eyesight. Eventually, Lady Gwanna was put to get drowned by angered king in the Yellow Sea. Although Lady Gwanng had one son with Jungcheon, he never got an opportunity to be a crown prince and in 255, Yak-ro, a son with Lady Yeon got the seat in 255, later Seocheon of Goguryeo.

War with the Wei
In 259 at the king's 12th year of reign, the Cao Wei general Yuchi Kai (尉遲楷) invaded with his army.  The king sent 5,000 cavalry to fight them in the Yangmaek region; the Wei forces were defeated and about 8,000 people slain.

Death
In 270, the king died at the age of 46, and was buried in Jungcheonji-won.

See also
History of Korea
Three Kingdoms of Korea
List of Korean monarchs

References

Goguryeo rulers
224 births
270 deaths
3rd-century monarchs in Asia
3rd-century Korean people